The Battle of Pulkkila was fought between Swedish and Russian forces near Pulkkila in Northern Ostrobothnia on 2 May 1808 during the Finnish War.

At the battle of Pulkkila on 2 May 1808, Johan August Sandels marched eastwards to liberate those parts of Finland that were under Russian control. During the march they encountered some Russian troops at Pulkkila. Sandels used about 800 men for the attack; of which 350 from the Västerbotten Regiment and 80 from the Savolax jägers. The Russian troops were led by Colonel Obuhov. The Russians were soon surrounded and tried desperately to break out, but they were forced back to a nearby village where the Russians were defeated after some vicious fighting. The Russian commander was forced to surrender to the attacking Swedes. The Swedes then went on and retook the town of Kuopio in the middle of Finland.

Sandels' offensive was one of the most remarkable operations of the entire war. During his operations against Barclay de Tolly's troops, he captured Russian depots, constantly harassed their rear areas, and committed actions that won him respect among both friends and foes.

However, Swedish success was only temporary in the Summer Campaign 1808 and the Russian counteroffensive resulted in the Swedish retreat in late August 1808.

Notes, citations and sources

Notes

Citations

Sources

Pulkkila 1808
Pulkkila
1808 in Finland
Pulkkila
Pulkkila
May 1808 events
History of North Ostrobothnia